Mark Norman Few (born December 27, 1962) is an American college basketball coach who has been the head coach at Gonzaga University since 1999.  He has served on Gonzaga's coaching staff since 1989, and has been a constant on the sidelines throughout a period that has seen the Bulldogs rise from mid-major obscurity to consistent NCAA tournament contenders. During his tenure as head coach, Few has led the Bulldogs to the NCAA Tournament every season (except 2019–20, when the team had secured an automatic bid but the tournament was canceled), a stretch that has garnered the Bulldogs recognition as a major basketball power despite playing in a mid-major conference. In his 24 seasons as head coach, his teams have won at least a share of 22 WCC regular season titles, 19 WCC tournament titles and have participated in the National Championship game twice (2017 and 2021).

Biography

Early life and education
Few was born in Creswell, Oregon, and was a star point guard at Creswell High School, graduating in 1981. He originally attended Linfield College, hoping to play basketball and baseball, but he was troubled by the after effects of a dislocated shoulder he suffered while playing football as a senior at Creswell. He then transferred to the University of Oregon, hoping to play baseball there, but the Ducks had dropped their varsity baseball program by the time he arrived in Eugene. He graduated from Oregon with a BS in physical education in 1987.

Coaching career

Assistant coach
Few entered the coaching profession even before receiving his degree, serving as an unpaid part-time assistant at his alma mater of Creswell High School starting in 1983, and advancing to a paid position from 1986 to 1988. During this time, he also worked at Oregon's summer basketball camps. After a season as an assistant at another Oregon school, Sheldon High School in Eugene, he moved to Spokane, Washington, joining the Gonzaga staff as a graduate assistant in 1989 under Dan Fitzgerald. He had some familiarity with the program, as he had befriended Dan Monson, then a Gonzaga assistant and later the head coach, during his time working the Oregon basketball camps. In 1990, he was promoted to a full-time assistant. As an assistant, Few helped lead Gonzaga to its first four postseason appearances—the 1994, 1996, and 1998 National Invitation Tournaments and the 1995 NCAA tournament.

In April 1999, Monson, who had just finished his second year as Gonzaga head coach, promoted Few to associate head coach.  This was immediately following the season in which Gonzaga became the nation's basketball darlings, making a run through the NCAA tournament, defeating Minnesota, Stanford, and Florida, to advance to the Elite Eight. In the West Regional finals Gonzaga lost to eventual national champions UConn by five points. When Monson left in late July to take the open head coaching job at Minnesota, Few, who had been designated as Monson's successor, was promoted to head coach.

Head coach
Taking over after Monson's abrupt departure, Few was able to maintain the Gonzaga program's success from his very first season and prevent the Bulldogs from being a one-year wonder and sinking back into obscurity.  He led them into the NCAA Sweet Sixteen each of the first two years.  He was only the second head coach in the nation to achieve this feat since the NCAA tournament expanded to 64 teams in 1985. The following year (2001–02), Few set an all-time record for NCAA Division I men's coaches by collecting 81 wins in his first three years as a head coach. The record stood until 2010 when Brad Stevens of Butler surpassed it. In 2017, Mark Few became the 3rd fastest coach to reach 500 wins in NCAA Division I history. The program's success has continued as Gonzaga has made the NCAA tournament in every one of Few's 21 completed seasons; indeed, he has been on hand for every postseason appearance in school history. The Bulldogs have also advanced to the WCC tournament title game in every season during Few's tenure. The Zags have won their way to every WCC Tournament championship game since 1998, and all but one since 1995.

With Few as head coach, the Gonzaga program produced its first five first-team All-Americans in Dan Dickau, Adam Morrison, Kelly Olynyk, Nigel Williams-Goss, and Rui Hachimura. All five have played in the NBA, along with Richie Frahm, Blake Stepp, Ronny Turiaf, Austin Daye, Jeremy Pargo, Robert Sacre, Elias Harris, Kevin Pangos,David Stockton, Domantas Sabonis, Kyle Wiltjer, Zach Collins, Johnathan Williams, Brandon Clarke, Zach Norvell, Killian Tillie, Joel Ayayi, Corey Kispert, and Jalen Suggs.

Few was named the West Coast Conference Coach of the Year for six consecutive seasons (2001 through 2006).

The 2006–07 season may well have been one of his better coaching jobs, as the team faced what could be called a "perfect storm":
Adam Morrison, a first-team All-America in 2005-06, chose to leave Gonzaga for the NBA with a year of eligibility left.
The Zags played an especially brutal nonconference schedule, with no fewer than nine opponents that would make the NCAA tournament.
The team's second-leading scorer and leading rebounder in 2006–07, Josh Heytvelt, was suspended after being arrested on drug charges in February 2007, and did not play again during the season.
The Zags ended the regular season at 21–10, their first season with double digits in losses since 1997–98, which was also the last season to date in which they failed to make the NCAA tournament. It had generally been thought that Gonzaga would have to win the WCC tournament to earn a bid to the NCAA tournament. However, Gonzaga would go on to win the conference tournament, notably beating a Santa Clara team in the final that had earlier handed the Zags their first home-court loss in nearly four years. They would go out in the first round of the NCAA tournament to Indiana.

A year later, despite losing to San Diego in the conference title game, the Bulldogs garnered an at-large bid in the NCAA Tournament.

On March 21, 2009, Few notched his 254th win as Gonzaga's head coach with a second-round victory in the NCAA Tournament, passing his former boss Fitzgerald as the winningest coach in school history.

During the 2012-13 season, Few led the Bulldogs to the No. 2 ranking in both major polls, the highest national ranking at the time in school history. Few broke that record a week later when the Bulldogs surged to No. 1 in both polls for the first time. It was also the first time a WCC school had ascended to the top spot since San Francisco in 1977. Gonzaga went on to receive its first No. 1 seed in the NCAA Tournament in school history, as well as a then school-record 32 wins.

During the 2014-15 season, Few led the Zags back to the No. 2 ranking in both major polls, along with a then school-record 22-game winning streak. Few guided Gonzaga to a No. 2 seed in the NCAA Tournament, his first Elite Eight appearance as head coach, and a then school-record 35 wins.

In 2016-17, Few led the Zags to arguably their greatest season up to that point in school history. They stormed through the regular season, starting with a school-record 29-game winning streak, which also broke the record for consecutive wins to start a season. By February, they had surged back to No. 1 in the polls. The winning streak and No. 1 ranking were lost when the Bulldogs lost to BYU on February 25. As it turned out, it would be the Bulldogs' only loss of the regular season. Gonzaga went on to receive a No. 1 seed in the NCAA Tournament for the second time in school history, and advanced to the Final Four for the first time in school history, losing to North Carolina in the National Championship. The Zags set a new school record with 37 wins, which was also tied for the second-most wins in NCAA Division I history. They also made the deepest NCAA Tournament run by a WCC team since San Francisco reached three consecutive Final Fours from 1955 to 1957.

Few was named as the National Coach of the Year in 2016-17 by the Associated Press, Naismith, and the USBWA, awarded with the Henry Iba Award.

In 2018-19, Few's No. 3 Gonzaga team defeated No. 1 Duke 89-87 in the Maui Invitational final to beat Duke for the first time and to beat a top-ranked team for the first time in team history.

During the COVID-19-shortened 2020-21 season, Few led Gonzaga to its first-ever undefeated regular and conference season at 26-0, he also ended the season with the longest current home win streak, a school record, at 51 games. It also marked the first time in school history that the Zags were ranked No. 1 in both the Associated Press and Collegiate Coaches Polls for the entire season. Few also continued his consecutive conference tournament championship win streaks with 8, making him the only coach in NCAA history to reach 8 or more twice in his career. Few ended the season by breaking his old school record of 29 by winning 31 straight games from the start of the season before losing in the NCAA Championship game.

National team career
Few was the head coach of the United States national team at the 2015 Pan American Games, where he led the US to a bronze medal.

In 2019, Few was elected as the assistant coach of the national select team, a 13-player squad that helps the national team training. He helped the national team prepare for the 2019 FIBA Basketball World Cup.

Personal life
Few and his wife Marcy, who were married together by his father in 1994, have three sons and one daughter. They have organized a charity golf tournament under the Coaches vs. Cancer umbrella. Since the tournament began in 2002, it has raised over $1 million for the American Cancer Society. 

Few is an avid fly fisherman.

In 2021, Few was given a three-game suspension from his coaching position at Gonzaga following an arrest for DUI.

Awards, records and achievements

NCAA
Highest winning percentage (minimum 600 games) : 

Most consecutive tournament appearances since starting as head coach : 24

 Only Coach to win 8 or more consecutive conference championships twice

3rd Fastest Coach to 500 Games (Adolph Rupp - 1st, Jerry Tarkanian - 2nd)

3rd Fastest Coach to 600 Games (Adolph Rupp - 1st, Jerry Tarkanian - 2nd)

2nd most wins in first 3 seasons (Brad Stevens)

2nd most wins in a season with 37 (Tied with Mike Krzyzewski twice, Bill Self, Bruce Weber & Jerry Tarkanian have one each) (John Calipari has 38, three times)

WCC Conference
Only coach to receive the Henry Iba Award in WCC

Most consecutive seasons named WCC coach of the year: 6

Most seasons named WCC coach of the year: 13

Most WCC regular season wins: 291

Most consecutive WCC regular season wins: 40

Most consecutive WCC regular season road wins: 39

Most WCC regular season championships: 22

Most WCC tournament wins: 45

Most WCC tournament championships: 19

Most Consecutive WCC tournament championships: 11

Gonzaga
Most wins in school history: 688

Most undefeated regular seasons: 1 (26-0)

Most wins in a season: 37

Best Season 31-1

Most consecutive wins to start a season: 31 (Few also holds the No. 2 spot at 29)

Most consecutive wins: 31 

Longest home court winning streak: 75

Most NCAA tournament appearances: 24

Most NCAA tournament wins: 40

Most NCAA championship game appearances: 2

Most final 4 appearances: 2

Most elite 8 appearances: 4

Most sweet 16 appearances: 12

Most round of 32 appearances: 18

Head coaching record

See also
 List of college men's basketball coaches with 600 wins
 List of NCAA Division I Men's Final Four appearances by coach

References

External links
 Gonzaga profile

1962 births
Living people
American men's basketball coaches
Basketball coaches from Oregon
College men's basketball head coaches in the United States
Gonzaga Bulldogs men's basketball coaches
Linfield University alumni
People from Creswell, Oregon
Sportspeople from Spokane, Washington
University of Oregon alumni